The 2nd constituency of the Corrèze is one of two French legislative constituencies in the Corrèze department (Limousin). There were three constituencies in the department until the 2010 redistricting of French legislative constituencies.

Following that redistricting, it consists of fifteen (pre-2015) cantons :
 Ayen, Beaulieu-sur-Dordogne, Beynat, Brive-la-Gaillarde Centre, Brive-la-Gaillarde Nord-Est, Brive-la-Gaillarde Nord-Ouest, Brive-la-Gaillarde Sud-Est, Brive-la-Gaillarde Sud-Ouest, Juillac, Larche, Lubersac, Malemortsur-Corrèze, Meyssac, Mercoeur and Saint-Privat.

Historic representation

Election results

2022 

 
 
 
 
 
 
 
 
|-
| colspan="8" bgcolor="#E9E9E9"|
|-

2017

2012 

Source: Ministry of the Interior

2007 

 
 
 
 
 
 
 
|-
| colspan="8" bgcolor="#E9E9E9"|
|-

2002

 
 
 
 
 
 
 
 
|-
| colspan="8" bgcolor="#E9E9E9"|
|-

1997

References

Sources
 Notes and portraits of the French MPs under the Fifth Republic, French National Assembly
 2012 results in the Corrèze's 2nd constituency, Minister of the Interior
 Constituencies of the Corrèze, Atlaspol website

2